İsmail Keleş (born March 5, 1988 in Ankara, Turkey) is a Turkish sport shooter competing in the pistol events.

Keleş began with sport shooting in 2007. He has competed since 2008.

He qualified for participation in the 10 m air pistol men event at the 2012 Summer Olympics after he won the silver medal at the 2012 ISSF World Cup held in Milan, Italy.  He also competed in the 50 m pistol at the 2012 Summer Olympics.

At the 2013 European Shooting Championships held in Osijek, Croatia from July 21 to August 4, he won the silver in the 50 m pistol event together with his team mates Ömer Alimoğlu and Yusuf Dikeç.

He competed at the 2016 Summer Olympics in the 10 and 50 m pistol.

Achievements

References

1988 births
Sportspeople from Ankara
Turkish male sport shooters
Turkish Gendarmerie personnel
Living people
ISSF pistol shooters
Shooters at the 2012 Summer Olympics
Shooters at the 2016 Summer Olympics
Olympic shooters of Turkey
European Games competitors for Turkey
Shooters at the 2015 European Games
Competitors at the 2018 Mediterranean Games
Mediterranean Games competitors for Turkey
Shooters at the 2020 Summer Olympics
21st-century Turkish people